Ibragim Suleimanovich Labazanov (born 18 April 1991) is a Russian Greco-Roman wrestler of Chechen descent. He won the national championships in 2016 and 2020, and he competed at the 2016 Summer Olympics in 59 kg, where in the Round of 32 he was eliminated by Almat Kebispayev of Kazakhstan.

He's the older brother of world wrestling champion Chingiz Labazanov.

References

External links
 

1987 births
Chechen people
Living people
Olympic wrestlers of Russia
Russian male sport wrestlers
Chechen sportsmen
People from Martynovsky District
Wrestlers at the 2016 Summer Olympics
European Wrestling Championships medalists
Sportspeople from Rostov Oblast
20th-century Russian people
21st-century Russian people